To Marry a Captain is a 1985 Soviet comedy film directed by Vitaliy Melnikov.

Plot 
The film tells about an independent young woman who meets the captain and begins to understand how great it is to feel loved.

Cast 
 Vera Glagoleva as Lena Zhuravlyova
 Viktor Proskurin as Captain Blinov
 Vera Vasilyeva
 Nikolay Rybnikov as Kondrat Petrovich
 Yuriy Demich
 Svetlana Kryuchkova		
 Fyodor Odinokov
 Tatyana Rudina
 Valentina Berezutskaya

References

External links 
 

1985 films
1980s Russian-language films
Soviet comedy films
1985 comedy films